"I Won't Be Home for Christmas" is the ninth episode of the twenty-sixth season of the American animated television series The Simpsons, and the 561st episode of the series. It originally aired on the Fox network in the United States on December 7, 2014. It is the thirteenth Christmas episode of the show.

Plot
The episode begins with Comic Book Guy and Kumiko Albertson watching the Cosmic Wars Special, with Comic Book Guy expressing shock and outrage that the special actually gets worse the more he watches it, and Kumiko stating he has every right to be angry.

Homer plans to fulfill Marge's Christmas Eve wishes by leaving work on time and arriving home to celebrate Christmas with his family. However, after suffering a car accident on the way home, he stops for a quick drink at Moe's, and when he tries to leave, Moe convinces him to stay there by honestly telling Homer how lonely and depressed he is. Homer learns that Moe had the clock 2 hours behind on purpose, and when he finally gets home, Marge is enraged and kicks him out, saying she does not want him in the house on Christmas. Homer then leaves on an odyssey through a deserted and chilly Springfield, with Moe inadvertently compounding his sadness by being preoccupied with karaoke when Homer shows up to try and talk to him, and to add insult to injury, Homer's car gets towed with his cell phone frozen inside it.

Meanwhile, Marge becomes depressed without Homer, but tells Bart and Lisa that she does not plan to forgive him. At that point, Moe, having found Homer's wallet that he left in the tavern, climbs down the 742 Evergreen Terrace chimney and tells Marge the truth about why Homer was out late on Christmas Eve. Marge immediately tries to call Homer and ask him to come home, but as he lost his phone, she ends up going out to look for him. Homer ends up at the miserable local movie theatre to watch a depressing Life is Beautiful-type of film alongside other lost souls like Kirk Van Houten, the Crazy Cat Lady, Groundskeeper Willie and Gil.

After Marge searches through the city and Homer ends up at a depressing party for mall workers, they each have epiphanies: Homer says that being without his family at Christmas is much worse than being with them, and Marge says that she should not always assume Homer is doing stupid things for no reasons. The two finally find each other at the party, reconcile and look forward to a happy new year.

The final scene features a preview of the next episode "The Man Who Came to Be Dinner".

Reception
The episode received an audience of 6.52 million, making it the most watched show on Fox that night.

Dennis Perkins of The A.V. Club gave the episode a B−, saying "The moderate pleasure to be gleaned from ‘I Won’t Be Home for Christmas’ comes from a show trying to wring some heart and laughs from a quarter-century of well-trod territory. The pleasures aren't inconsiderable, but they're effortful."

This episode was nominated for an Annie award for outstanding achievement in writing in an Animated TV/Broadcast Production in 2016.

References

External links 
 

2014 American television episodes
American Christmas television episodes
The Simpsons (season 26) episodes